The James Riley Josselyn House is a historic home in Eastlake Weir, Florida, United States. It is located at 13845 Alternate US 27. On July 13, 1993, it was added to the U.S. National Register of Historic Places.

References

External links

 Marion County listings at National Register of Historic Places
 Marion County listings at Florida's Office of Cultural and Historical Programs

Houses on the National Register of Historic Places in Florida
National Register of Historic Places in Marion County, Florida
Houses in Marion County, Florida
Vernacular architecture in Florida
Colonial Revival architecture in Florida